The Nudist on the Late Shift and Other True Tales of Silicon Valley is a book by Po Bronson.

See also
The First $20 Million Is Always the Hardest

References

External links 
 Introduction to The Nudist on The Late Shift at pobronson.com

1999 non-fiction books
American non-fiction books
Random House books
Naturism in the United States